Purin may refer to:

 Purin (pudding), Japanese name for crème caramel or custard pudding
 Purin (Sanrio), or Pudding Dog, a character marketed by Sanrio, creators of Hello Kitty
 Fon Purin, or Pudding Fong, a character in the anime Tokyo Mew Mew
 Alexei Purin (born 1955), Russian poet and critic
 Purin, Japanese name for Jigglypuff, a Pokémon character

See also
 Purina (disambiguation)
 Purine, an organic compound
 Purim, a Jewish holiday